The Gone Wait is the 35th album by Jandek, and the first of two released in 2003 It is Corwood Industries release #0773, and is the first release to feature the artist accompanying himself on fretless electric bass, rather than on his usual acoustic or electric guitar. The album's title was also the name of a song on Jandek's 1993 release Twelfth Apostle.

Track listing

Reviews
Vocals and... bass! ...The instrument suits him. The low sounds are like a cool bath after the harsh high end of the last few.
— Seth Tisue Jandek website

External links
Seth Tisue's The Gone Wait review

2003 albums
Jandek albums
Corwood Industries albums